Janelson dos Santos Carvalho (born March 24, 1969), known as Janelson, is a Brazilian former volleyball player who competed in the 1992 Summer Olympics.

In 1992 he was part of the Brazilian team which won the gold medal in the Olympic tournament. He played two matches.

External links
 

1969 births
Living people
Brazilian men's volleyball players
Olympic volleyball players of Brazil
Volleyball players at the 1992 Summer Olympics
Olympic gold medalists for Brazil
Olympic medalists in volleyball
Medalists at the 1992 Summer Olympics
Sportspeople from Porto Alegre